We Are the Others is the third full-length album by the Dutch symphonic metal band Delain. It was released in the Benelux and Germany on 1 June 2012 and in the United Kingdom and France on 4 June by CNR Music, who took over Delain when Warner Music refused to release We Are the Others. The album was released in the US on 3 July. The first single, "Get the Devil Out of Me", was released on 13 April. The second single "We Are The Others" and its video was released on 11 September 2012. This is the first album by Delain without any studio songs with guest vocalist Marko Hietala. Live versions of "The Gathering" and "Control the Storm" are featured on the special edition of the album with Hietala singing his parts live.

History
During their 2011 live shows, Delain debuted three new songs from the album – "Manson" (which was later renamed to "Mother Machine"), "Get the Devil Out of Me" and "Milk and Honey".

In an interview with Sonic Cathedral, vocalist Charlotte Wessels discussed the inspiration she drew from the Sophie Lancaster case:

Originally intended for release in early 2012, the album's release date was unknown after Warner Music's purchase of Roadrunner Records but it was announced via a Facebook message on the band official page that the album would be released on 1 June 2012 with the album's first single, "Get the Devil Out of Me", being released on 13 April 2012. The song was released for listening online on 3 April on their official website. The second single from the album was announced as the title track, "We Are the Others", and a music video was filmed. Several well-known personalities from the metal scene appear in this video, such as George Oosthoek, Sharon den Adel, Robert Westerholt and ex-member Rob van der Loo.

Track listing
All lyrics by Charlotte Wessels and  Charlotte Wessels/Tripod

Personnel

Delain
Charlotte Wessels - vocals
Martijn Westerholt - keyboards
Timo Somers - lead guitar, ambient guitar
Otto Schimmelpenninck van der Oije - bass
Sander Zoer - drums

Additional musicians
Guus Eikens - rhythm guitar
Oliver Philipps - lead guitar, ambient guitar, keyboards and vocals arrangements
Henka Johansson - additional drums
Burton C. Bell - guest vocals on "Where Is the Blood"
Anders "Gary" Wikström - backing vocals

Production
TriPod (Jacob Hellner, Fredrik Thomander, Anders Wikström) - producers, mixing
Tom van Heesch - engineer, mixing
Ulf Kruckenberg - engineer
Svante Forsbäch - mastering

Charts

References

External links 
 Metallum Archives
 Delain Interview 2012

Delain albums
2012 albums
Roadrunner Records albums